Niklas Nienaß (born 14 April 1992) is a German politician of the Alliance 90/The Greens who has been serving as a Member of the European Parliament since 2019.

Political career
In parliament, Nienaß serves on the Committee on Regional Development and the Committee on Culture and Education. Since 2021, he has been part of the parliament's delegation to the Conference on the Future of Europe.

In addition to his committee assignments, Nienaß is part of the parliament's delegation to the EU-Kazakhstan, EU-Kyrgyzstan, EU-Uzbekistan and EU-Tajikistan Parliamentary Cooperation Committees and for relations with Turkmenistan and Mongolia. He is also a member of the Spinelli Group, the European Parliament Intergroup on Children’s Rights, the European Parliament Intergroup on Climate Change, Biodiversity and Sustainable Development, the European Parliament Intergroup on Seas, Rivers, Islands and Coastal Areas and the European Parliament Intergroup on LGBT Rights.

Political positions
In May 2021, Nienaß joined a group of 39 mostly Green Party lawmakers from the European Parliament who in a letter urged the leaders of Germany, France and Italy not to support Arctic LNG 2, a $21 billion Russian Arctic liquefied natural gas (LNG) project, due to climate change concerns.

References

External links

Living people
MEPs for Germany 2019–2024
Alliance 90/The Greens MEPs
1992 births